The 1974–75 Macedonian Republic League was the 31st since its establishment. FK Pelister won their 3rd championship title.

Participating teams

Final table

External links
SportSport.ba
Football Federation of Macedonia 

Macedonian Football League seasons
Yugo
3